The 2005 IIHF World U18 Championship Division III Qualification was an international under-18 ice hockey tournament run by the International Ice Hockey Federation. The Division III Qualification fifth level of competition at the 2005 IIHF World U18 Championships and took place between 18 and 20 February 2005 in Ankara, Turkey. The tournament was won by Turkey who upon winning qualified to compete in the 2005 IIHF World U18 Championship Division III that was held in Sofia, Bulgaria.

Overview
The 2005 IIHF World U18 Championship Division III Qualification began on 18 February 2005 in Ankara, Turkey. Bosnia and Herzegovina and Turkey entered the Division III Qualification tournament after being relegated from the Division III tournament of the 2004 IIHF World U18 Championships, while Armenia made their debut at the World U18 Championships.

Turkey finished first after winning both of their games and qualified to compete in the 2005 IIHF World U18 Championship Division III that was set to be held in Sofia, Bulgaria the following month. Bosnia and Herzegovina finished in second place after winning their game against Armenia. Muamer Dzamalija of Bosnia and Herzegovina finished as the tournaments top scorer after recording eight points including three goals and five assists. Turkey's Baris Ucele finished as the tournaments leading goaltender with a save percentage of 89.19.

Standings

Fixtures
All times local.

Scoring leaders
List shows the top ten skaters sorted by points, then goals.

Leading goaltenders
Only the top goaltenders, based on save percentage, who have played 40% of their team's minutes are included in this list.

References

World
Qual
International ice hockey competitions hosted by Turkey
Youth ice hockey in Turkey
2005
Qualification